The West Brabant waterline  (Dutch: West-Brabantse waterlinie) (later: Stelling West Noord-Brabant) is a Dutch military defense line based on inundation.

The West Brabant waterline is said to be the second oldest in The Netherlands (after the Eendrachtslinie) and was constructed in 1628. It is located between the fortresses of Bergen op Zoom and Steenbergen and consisted of four forts. From Bergen op Zoom, the line consists successively of the fortresses Moermont (disappeared), Pinssen and De Roovere, the inundation plain Halsterens Laag, the fortress Steenbergen and finally fort Henricus. By opening a sluice in the Steenbergse Vliet, seawater could flow from this last fort, causing the Halsters and Oudlands to flood low. The brooks Ligne and Zoom could also be used to flood the land.

The initiative for the construction was taken by the Staten van Zeeland and Staten van Holland. The purpose of the line was to protect the mentioned cities against a Spanish attack from the east. The second goal was to secure the Eendracht, the natural waterway between these regions.

Between 1628 and 1830 refuge was sought in inundation six times, once against the Spaniards, four times against the French and the last time against the Belgians.

The line was extended south of Bergen op Zoom in the World War I to be able to repel a possible attack by England. In that period the line was called the 'Stelling West Noord-Brabant' for the first time. Via Zeeland, the Anglo-French coalition would be able to reach Belgium and Germany more easily. In 1809 an invasion of Zeeland by England was repulsed by French and Dutch troops of Napoleon. On the other hand, in World War I, Germany could benefit from using the Antwerp harbour and the extra supply lines to Belgium.

In the Bergen op Zoom part of the waterline, at Fort de Roovere, in 2011 a "sunken" bridge called the Moses Bridge was opened.

It is part of the Zuiderwaterlinie (Southern water line), a line of defence that stretches from the western part to the eastern part of North Brabant.

La Vuelta 2022 will pass through the area.

Forts along the water line 

 Fort Henricus 
 Fort de Roovere
 Fort Moermont 
 Fort Pinssen

See also

Dutch waterlines
Defence Line of Amsterdam
Frisian Water Line
Grebbe line
IJssel Line
Maas Line
Peel-Raam Line
Dutch Water Line

Other
Defence lines of the Netherlands
List of fortifications

External links 
 Tourist website of North Brabant regarding Zuiderwaterlinie and so the West Brabant Waterline

References 

Steenbergen
Bergen op Zoom
Eighty Years' War
Fortifications in the Netherlands
Military history of the Netherlands
History of North Brabant